Roberto Oscar Bonano (born 24 January 1970) is an Argentine retired footballer who played as a goalkeeper.

Already in his 30s, he moved from River Plate to Spain where he spent the remainder of his 17-year professional career in representation of three teams, mainly Alavés.

Bonano earned 13 caps for Argentina, and was part of the squad at the 2002 World Cup.

Playing career

Club
Born in Rosario, Santa Fe, Bonano represented in his native country Rosario Central and Club Atlético River Plate, winning several titles with the latter including five national championships. In 2001, at 31, he moved to FC Barcelona, initially as first-choice; he made his La Liga debut on 26 August of that year, in a 2–1 away win against Sevilla FC.

After the emergence of Víctor Valdés from the Catalans' youth ranks, however, Bonano was deemed surplus to requirements and signed with Real Murcia, joining Deportivo Alavés in Segunda División in the summer of 2004 after his team's relegation. With the Basques, he was instrumental in a 2005 top flight promotion but, in the following campaign, played second-fiddle to compatriot Franco Costanzo who also played with him at River, as the season ended in relegation.

Bonano's last year at Alavés was highly turbulent, after being suspended by the club's elusive chairman/owner/manager Dmitry Piterman, after the latter had had a run-in with teammate Lluís Carreras. He retired at the season's close, aged 38.

International
Bonano represented Argentina at various youth levels. He made his senior debut on 28 December 1996, in a 2–3 friendly loss to Yugoslavia.

Bonano was subsequently picked up for the 2002 FIFA World Cup as a backup to Pablo Cavallero and Germán Burgos, and appeared in a total of 13 matches for his country.

Coaching career
From 2011 to 2013, Bonano worked as assistant manager under Eduardo Berizzo, first with Estudiantes de La Plata then O'Higgins F.C. in Chile. Again in Spain, he was assistant and goalkeeper coach at Carreras' RCD Mallorca.

On 6 July 2015, Bonano reunited with compatriot Berizzo, joining his staff at RC Celta de Vigo. Two years later, in the same capacity and under the same coach, he signed with Sevilla FC.

Honours

Club
Rosario Central
Copa CONMEBOL: 1995

River Plate
Argentine Primera División: Apertura 1996, Clausura 1997, Apertura 1997, Apertura 1999, Clausura 2000
Copa Libertadores: 1996
Supercopa Sudamericana: 1997

References

External links
FutbolPasion stats 

1970 births
Living people
Footballers from Rosario, Santa Fe
Argentine footballers
Association football goalkeepers
Argentine Primera División players
Rosario Central footballers
Club Atlético River Plate footballers
La Liga players
Segunda División players
FC Barcelona players
Real Murcia players
Deportivo Alavés players
Argentina youth international footballers
Argentina under-20 international footballers
Argentina international footballers
2002 FIFA World Cup players
Argentine expatriate footballers
Expatriate footballers in Spain
Argentine expatriate sportspeople in Spain